Yogeshwar may refer to:
 Yogeshwara, a Sanskrit epithet
 Yogeshwar (name), a personal name (including a list of people with the name)
 Yogeshwar (mountain), a mountain in the Himalayas
 20522 Yogeshwar, a minor planet